The 1925 Clemson  Tigers football team was an American football team that represented Clemson Agricultural College as a member of the Southern Conference during its 1925 football season. In its third season under head coach Bud Saunders, Clemson compiled a 1–7 record (0–4 against conference opponents), tied for last place in the conference, was shut out in five of its eight games, and was outscored by a total of 160 to 18. The team played its home games at Riggs Field in Clemson, South Carolina (then known as Calhoun, South Carolina).

Schedule

References

Clemson
Clemson Tigers football seasons
Clemson Tigers football